Young Pirate is the youth organisation of the Swedish Pirate Party. It was founded in December 2006 and had, from April 2009 until spring 2010, over 22,000 members. It was by far the largest political youth organisation by member count in Sweden.

See also 
 Young Pirates (Junge Piraten), Germany
 Young Pirates of Europe

References

Pirate Party (Sweden)
Youth wings of political parties in Sweden
Organizations established in 2006
2006 establishments in Sweden